Natural (stylized as ИATURAL) is the fourth album by Japanese rock band, Orange Range. The album was officially released on October 12, 2005 after *: Asterisk, Love Parade, Onegai! Senorita and Kizuna, were released as promotional singles. The song Asterisk was used as the first theme for the Japanese and American versions of the anime show Bleach.

Overview 
It is Orange Range's second highest selling album and longest charted album. The album was released after having four singles recorded and released in various promotions. This album is notable for having every song used in some major promotion by various Japanese television stations.

Track listing
 
 
  
 
 
 
 God69 (God rock)

References

2005 albums
Orange Range albums
Gr8! Records albums